Shanto-Mariam University of Creative Technology (SMUCT) is a private university established in 2003 in Dhaka, Bangladesh. It was named after Md. Imamul Kabir Shanto (founder and chairman) and his wife Tahmina Chowdhury Kabir (Mariam) (founder and vice chairman).

Academic programs
The academic programs of the university are conducted by three faculties.

Faculty of Design & Technology:
 B.A. (Hons) Fashion Design & Technology
 B.A. (Hons) Apparel Manufacturing Management & Technology
 B.A. (Hons) Interior Architecture
 B.A. (Hons) Graphic Design & Multimedia
* Bachelor of Architecture
 B.Sc. (Hons) Computer Science
 B.Sc. (Hons) Computer Science & Engineering
 M.A. Fashion Design/Product Design
 M.A. Interior Design

Faculty of Fine & Performing Arts
 B.Fine Arts (Hons) and Diploma Drawing & Painting
 M.Fine Arts Drawing & Painting
 B.Music (Hons) Ravindra, Nazrul, Classical
 B.Music (Hons) Dance
 M.Music (Masters) Ravindra, Nazrul, Classical
 M.Music (Masters) Dance

Faculty of Management & General Studies
 Bachelor of Business Administration (BBA)
 Bachelor of Laws (LLB)
 B.A. (Hons) in English (language & literature)
 BSS (Hons) in Sociology & Anthropology
 MBA Product & Fashion Merchandising
 Master of Business Administration (MBA)
 Executive MB
 Master of Laws (LLM)
 M.A. in English
 M.A. in Islamic Studies
 M.A. in Bengali
 MSS in Government & Politics
 MSS in Sociology & Anthropology

List of vice-chancellors 
 Prof. Samsun Nahar ( present )

Shanto-Mariam Academy of Creative Technology

Shanto-Mariam Academy of Creative Technology was established to spread up-to-date design, cultural and technical education throughout the country. It is a sister concern of the university that focuses on:
 Art
 Music (Ravindra, Nazrul, Classical)
 Dance (Bharata Natyam, Kathak, Folk dance, Manipuri)
 Instrumental music (Tabla, Guitar, Violin)
 Correct Pronunciation
 Recitation
 Acting
 News reading
These are open to all from a 5-year-old child and above. One year diploma and six month certificate courses are offered on Fashion design, Interior design, Graphic design, Multimedia, and Music. The academy also offers vocational SSC in Automotive, Garment design & pattern cutting, and Interior with Auto CAD under the Open University. The academy also offers SSC and HSC program for under-privileged students who are working.

Shanto-Mariam Institute of Creative Technology

Shanto-Mariam Institute of Creative Technology, an education institute of the Shanto-Mariam Foundation, is the only institute in Bangladesh offering BTEC/Edexcel National and Higher National diplomas in the following subjects:
 Fashion design
 3D design
 Graphic Design & Multimedia
 Clothing merchandising
 Information Technology
 BBA
 Apparel Merchandising

References

Further reading

External links
 

Universities of Uttara
Educational institutions established in 2003
2003 establishments in Bangladesh
Private universities in Bangladesh
Universities and colleges in Dhaka